Matthew Miller, better known by his stage name GDP, is an American hip hop recording artist from West Orange, New Jersey.

History
GDP began in 2008 with the release of a split with Dirty Money. The following year he released his debut full-length album, titled Realistic Expectations via Say-10 Records. In 2010, GDP released his first cassette titled Magic Bullet via Ride The Fury Records.

In 2011, GDP released his second full-length album titled Useless Eaters via Run For Cover Records.

In 2013, GDP released a Vinyl with The Wrong Address, titled Holla via Run For Cover.

In 2014, GDP released a compilation album titled Collectibles via Smokers Cough and Ride The Fury. In March 2014, The Front Bottoms announced at the South by Southwest music festival plans to release a split with GDP sometime in the future. The 7" split was officially announced the following year and was released on April 18, 2015 (Record Store Day).

Discography
Studio albums
Realistic Expectations (2009) (Say-10)
Useless Eaters  (2011, Run For Cover)
Holla (2013, Run For Cover)
EP's
 Involvement (2007, Division East Records)
 Makeup Smearing Python (2012, Smokers Cough)
Magic Bullet 2 (2016, Ride The Fury)
Vinyl / Splits
GDP, Dirty Money 7" (2008, Division East)
The Front Bottoms, GDP 7" (2015, Bar/None Records, Run For Cover Records)
Holla (2013, Run For Cover Records) 
Cassettes 
 Magic Bullet cassette (2009, Ride The Fury Records)
 Tunnel Buddies cassette (2012, Ride The Fury Records)
Compilations
 Instrumental Installations Vol. 1 (Bandcamp exclusive)
Collectibles (2014, Smokers Cough, Ride The Fury)

References

Living people
People from West Orange, New Jersey
Rappers from New Jersey
Run for Cover Records artists
21st-century American rappers
Year of birth missing (living people)